John Oliver (July 31, 1856–August 17, 1927) was a British-Canadian politician and farmer in British Columbia, Canada.

Oliver won a seat in the provincial legislature in the 1900 election and became leader of the opposition. He lost his seat in the 1909 election. He returned to the legislature in the 1916 election as a Liberal member, and became Minister of Agriculture and Railways in the cabinet of Harlan Carey Brewster. Oliver succeeded Brewster to become the 19th premier of British Columbia when Brewster died in 1918. Oliver's government developed the produce industry in the Okanagan Valley, and tried to persuade the federal government to lower the freight rate for rail transport.  Oliver also in 1923 hosted the visit of Warren Harding to Vancouver, the first visit of a sitting United States President to Canada in history.

Oliver remained premier until his death in 1927.

John Oliver Secondary School in Vancouver, British Columbia, John Oliver Park in Delta, BC, Mount John Oliver in the Premier Range of the Cariboo Mountains, the town of Oliver, British Columbia, and Oliver Street in Williams Lake, British Columbia, are all named after him.

Electoral history

|Liberal
|John Oliver
|align="right"|447
|align="right"|59.13%
|align="right"|
|align="right"|unknown
|- bgcolor="white"
!align="right" colspan=3|Total valid votes
!align="right"|756  	
!align="right"|100.00%
!align="right"|
|- bgcolor="white"
!align="right" colspan=3|Total rejected ballots
!align="right"|
!align="right"|
!align="right"|
|- bgcolor="white"
!align="right" colspan=3|Turnout
!align="right"|%
!align="right"|
!align="right"|
|}

|Liberal
|John Oliver
|align="right"|430
|align="right"|62.23%
|align="right"|
|align="right"|unknown
|- bgcolor="white"
!align="right" colspan=3|Total valid votes
!align="right"|691
!align="right"|100.00%
!align="right"|
|- bgcolor="white"
!align="right" colspan=3|Total rejected ballots
!align="right"|
!align="right"|
!align="right"|
|- bgcolor="white"
!align="right" colspan=3|Turnout
!align="right"|%
!align="right"|
!align="right"|
|}

|Liberal
|John Oliver
|align="right"|551 	  	 		
|align="right"|41.87%
|align="right"|
|align="right"|unknown
|- bgcolor="white"
!align="right" colspan=3|Total valid votes
!align="right"|1,316 
!align="right"|100.00%
!align="right"|
|- bgcolor="white"
!align="right" colspan=3|Total rejected ballots
!align="right"|
!align="right"|
!align="right"|
|- bgcolor="white"
!align="right" colspan=3|Turnout
!align="right"|%
!align="right"|
!align="right"|
|- bgcolor="white"
!align="right" colspan=7|1  Results of recount as reported in New Westminster Columbian 29 November 1909, p. 1
|}
	  	  	  	 

|Liberal
|John Oliver
|align="right"|308 	 	  	 		
|align="right"|29.17%
|align="right"|
|align="right"|unknown
|- bgcolor="white"
!align="right" colspan=3|Total valid votes
!align="right"|1,056
!align="right"|100.00%
!align="right"|
|- bgcolor="white"
!align="right" colspan=3|Total rejected ballots
!align="right"|
!align="right"|
!align="right"|
|- bgcolor="white"
!align="right" colspan=3|Turnout
!align="right"|%
!align="right"|
!align="right"|
|}

References
 

1856 births
1927 deaths
Premiers of British Columbia
English emigrants to Canada
British Columbia Liberal Party MLAs
Leaders of the British Columbia Liberal Party
People from Hartington, Derbyshire